Transfigurations is a novel by Michael Bishop published in 1979.

Plot summary
Transfigurations is a novel in which an anthropologist studies the Asadi, a culturally and technologically primitive alien race.

Reception
Greg Costikyan reviewed Transfigurations in Ares Magazine #8 and commented that "Despite its narrative flaws, Transfigurations is exceptionally well written, and Bishop is a writer whose work deserves close attention."

Kirkus Reviews states "Some intriguing speculations about behavior -- but Bishop's usually engaging curiosity blends poorly here with the traditional furniture of outer-space fiction."

Reviews
Review by Tom Easton (1980) in Analog Science Fiction/Science Fact, January 1980 
Review by Charles N. Brown (1980) in Locus, #230 February 1980 
Review by John Clute (1980) in Foundation, #19 June 1980 
Review by Joseph Nicholas (1980) in Vector 98 
Review by Theodore Sturgeon (1981) in Rod Serling's The Twilight Zone Magazine, June 1981

References

1979 American novels
1979 science fiction novels
American science fiction novels
Berkley Books books